Archibald Alexander Leslie-Melville, 13th Earl of Leven, 12th Earl of Melville KT DL (6 August 1890 – 15 January 1947) was a Scottish soldier, and peer.

He was educated at Oxford and Royal Military College, Sandhurst. He played for the Oxford University Polo on a Handicap of +3. He served in World War I, where he was wounded. He was Captain in the Royal Scots Fusiliers. He was Lieutenant-Colonel, and Brevet Colonel in the Lovat Scouts.
He was a Representative peer for Scotland, between 1927 and 1947. He was made Knight of the Thistle in 1934; and was Lord Lieutenant of Nairnshire from 1935 to 1947. He donated his collection of nineteenth century drawings and water-colours, which include scenes from Great Britain and Italy, to the Bodleian Library in 1920.

Family
He married Lady Rosamond Sylvia Diana Mary Foljambe (died 12 April 1974), on 3 September 1918; they had five children:
Lady Jean Elizabeth Leslie Melville (25 June 1921 – 8 March 2010)
Alexander Robert Leslie-Melville, 14th Earl of Leven (13 May 1924 – 7 April 2012)
Hon. George David Leslie Melville (13 May 1924 – 23 June 1997)
Hon. Ronald Joscelyn Leslie Melville (22 November 1926 – 1987)
Hon. Alan Duncan Leslie Melville (11 October 1928 – 26 October 2019)

References

1890 births
1947 deaths
Knights of the Thistle
Earls of Leven
Scottish representative peers
British Army personnel of World War I
Royal Scots Fusiliers officers
Lovat Scouts officers
Lord-Lieutenants of Nairn